Fredrik Steen (6 September 1895 – 22 October 1970) was a Norwegian pharmacist and businessperson.

He was a son of Emil Steen and Laura Steen. He was a grandson of Emil Steen (1829–1884), a nephew of Johan and Christian Steen and a first cousin of Erling Steen.

Several family members were owners of Steen & Strøm, but Fredrik Steen's father had become a partner in the pharmaceutical wholesaling company Nyegaard & Co. His father was the sole owner of this company from 1913, and transformed it from a wholesaling company to a manufacturer of pharmaceutical products. However, he died in 1915. Fredrik's mother Laura ran the company until 1921, when Fredrik took over. He orchestrated a merger with Koren & Gedde and brought that company's owner Sverre Blix on board as co-owner.

Fredrik Steen had taken the cand.pharm. degree in 1916, and been an assistant at the Royal Frederick University. By 1921 he was the manager of both Nyegaard & Co and Koren & Gedde, and alternated every second year with Sverre Blix in being chairman of the board of Nyegaard & Co. He was also a board member of Koren & Gedde and A/S Para. Steen retired in 1960.

He was a vice chairman of Norsk Farmaceutisk Selskap. He was also involved in dog breeding, most specifically of English setters. He died in October 1970.

References

1895 births
1970 deaths
University of Oslo alumni
Norwegian pharmacologists
20th-century Norwegian businesspeople
Businesspeople in the pharmaceutical industry